The Bahraini King's Cup is a cup competition involving teams from the Bahraini Premier League and 2nd tier. The 2011 edition was once again moved and started before the regular 2011/12 domestic leagues started.

First round

Second round

Quarter-finals

Semi-finals

1 Al Hidd players and officials were no show against Muharraq who were declared winners 3–0. The semi-finals were scheduled to take place on Monday, but the BFA decided to have these matches played one day later. This decision was to allow the international players from the four clubs to rest after leading the national team to a 3–1 win over Saudi Arabia in the soccer tournament of the First GCC Games held on Saturday.

And as a sign of rejection to BFA's decision, Al Hidd players and officials were present at the National Stadium on Monday to show their neglecting of BFA's late decision.

Final

References

Bahraini King's Cup seasons
King's Cup
Bahrain